The following list of heritage places in the Shire of Toodyay is based on information from the Western Australian State Heritage Office.

References

Shire of Toodyay
Toodyay